Yaba College of Technology, popularly known as YABATECH, was founded in 1947, and is Nigeria's first higher educational institution. It is located in Yaba, Lagos. It has a student enrollment of over 16,000.

Overview

Yaba College of Technology was established in 1947 as a successor of Yaba Higher College. It attained autonomous status in 1969 by virtue of Decree 23 which granted it the mandate to provide full-time and part-time courses of instruction and training in technology, applied science, commerce and management, agricultural production and distribution; and for research.

Yaba College of Technology is the first higher institution in Nigeria to establish a Centre for Entrepreneurship Development, with linkages with the world of commerce and industry. The centre offers compulsory courses which must be taken by all students throughout their stay in the college.

There is a Quality Assurance Unit in the college which monitors the quality of academic service delivery.

The Applied Research and Technology Innovation (ARTI) Unit was established to promote research and linkages with private sector organizations for the exploitation and use of research. ARTI also assists to promote linkages between students of Yabatech and students of other institutions especially in the area of research.

Free medical service is provided at the Medical Centre, which is open 24/7. Sports facilities are provided at the sport complex which is located at the centre of the campus. The college has won the Nigeria Polytechnic Games Association five times out of sixteen editions of the competition.

The college has a second campus at Epe, this campus is home to the Department of Agricultural Technology and Michael Otedola Information and Communication Centre.

The College is currently headed by Mr Uduak Iyang Udoh, the Acting Rector, taking over the leadership from Engineer Obafemi Omokungbe, who is the first alumnus of the institution to be appointed Rector.

 The name was changed to Federal Polytechnic Yaba in 1979, but changed back to the current one in 1980. The over 70 years Institution has been headed by a number of indigenous principals and rectors:

 Dr E.A Akinleye – Principal (1970-1975)
 Mr G.M Okufi – Rector (1975-1985)
 Dr Philip Adegbile – Rector (1985-1993)
 Mrs F.A Odugbesan – Rector (1993-2001)
 Mr Olubunmi Owoso – Rector (2001-2009)
 Dr(Mrs) M.K Ladipo – Rector (2009-2017)
 Engr. Obafemi Owoseni Omokungbe – Rector (2018-2023)
 Mr. Uduak Iyang Udoh- Ag. Rector (incumbent)

Courses and programmes 
Yaba College of Technology has eight schools and thirty-four academic departments with a total of sixty-four accredited programmes, across ND, HND and Post-HND levels. The college also offers certificate courses.

YABATECH offers B.Sc. (Ed) courses in Technical and Vocational education and Postgraduate Diplomas in Engineering. The two programmes are run in conjunction with the University of Nigeria, Nsukka and the Federal University of Technology, Akure, respectively. The student population which is made up of both full-time and part-time students is in the range of 15,000, while the staff strength is 1,600.

In April 2015, the National Board for Technical Education (NBTE) approved five new courses for Yaba College of Technology. The courses are Higher National Diploma in Mass Communication, Banking and Finance, Metallurgy Engineering, National Diploma in Welding and Fabrication and Public Administration.

In June 2019, Yaba College of Technology made the move to partner with a leading Nigerian security solutions company to design and implement a Security Management Certification Programme. According to the duo, the programme targets individuals, who desire to be modern security managers and those in active security employment or planning to venture into the security industry from managerial levels. Speaking at an event organised recently by the institutions to sign a Memorandum of Understanding (MoU), Director, Yabatech Consult Limited, Uduak Inyang-Udoh, said the collaboration would bridge the knowledge gap in attaining global security standard.

Library 
The Yabatech library is the nerve center of academic activities in the college. The library holds large volumes of collection in print and non print formats to cater for the information needs of staff, students ad the entire college community.

Yabatech Radio 
Yabatech Radio (89.3 MHz FM) is the official campus radio of Yaba College of Technology, covering part of Lagos State. The radio station officially came to life under the administration of Engr. Femi Omokungbe as Rector, Yaba College of Technology.

The radio station was established primarily to  serve the YABATECH community and its neighboring communities through local programme development, exposition of local talents, music, news, weather, and market information as well as giving a voice to the populace. In addition, it serves as a training ground for students of the mass communication department of the college.

Notable alumni

 Olusegun Adejumo, visual artist
 Josy Ajiboye, cartoonist
 Ayodeji Balogun, entrepreneur, commodity trader and CEO
 Omotola Jalade Ekeinde, actress
 Fecko, musician, emcee
 Ruth Kadiri, actress and film producer
 Kaffy, dancer
 Jide Kosoko, actor, director and producer
 Bidemi Olaoba, gospel singer, songwriter and composer
 Tim Owhefere, politician

Architecture and monuments

See also
List of polytechnics in Nigeria
Yaba Higher College alumni‎

References

External links
 Yaba College of Technology official website
 Yaba College of Technology on the African Studies Center

 
Technological universities in Nigeria
Educational institutions established in 1947
1947 establishments in Nigeria
Public universities in Nigeria